The 2010 WGC-HSBC Champions was a golf tournament contested from 4–7 November 2010 at the Sheshan Golf Club in Shanghai, China. It was the second WGC-HSBC Champions tournament, and the fourth of four World Golf Championships events held in 2010. It was won by Francesco Molinari of Italy who completed a wire-to-wire one stroke victory over Lee Westwood to win his first WGC event.

Field
The following is a list of players for the 2010 WGC-HSBC Champions. Players who have qualified from multiple categories are listed in the first category in which they are eligible. The numbers of other qualifying categories are in parentheses next to the player's name.

1. Winners of the four major championships and The Players Championship
Tim Clark,  Martin Kaymer (5,12), Graeme McDowell (5,12), Phil Mickelson (2,12), Louis Oosthuizen (5,12)

2. Winners of the previous four World Golf Championships
Ernie Els (3,12), Hunter Mahan (3,12), Ian Poulter (12)

3. Winners of the 23 top rated PGA Tour events (35 events met rating)
Ben Crane, Anthony Kim (12), Rory McIlroy (12), Ryan Palmer, Camilo Villegas, Lee Westwood (5,12)
Qualified but did not play: Jonathan Byrd, Jason Day, Jim Furyk (12), Charley Hoffman, Dustin Johnson (12), Zach Johnson (12), Matt Kuchar (12), Geoff Ogilvy, Justin Rose (12), Steve Stricker (12), Bubba Watson (12)

4. Top 5 available players from the FedEx Cup points list
Paul Casey (12), Luke Donald (5,12), Retief Goosen (12), Nick Watney, K. J. Choi 
Qualified but did not play:  Martin Laird

5. Winners of the 23 top rated European Tour events (25 events met rating)
Fredrik Andersson Hed, Ross Fisher, Richard Green, Peter Hanson, David Horsey, Miguel Ángel Jiménez, Richard S. Johnson, Robert Karlsson, Simon Khan, Matteo Manassero, Edoardo Molinari (8,12),  Álvaro Quirós,  Yang Yong-eun

6. Top 5 available players from the Race to Dubai
Rhys Davies, Pádraig Harrington (12), Francesco Molinari, Charl Schwartzel (9), Danny Willett

7. Nine players - winners of the top rated Asian Tour events, remainder from Order of Merit (4 events met rating)
Kiradech Aphibarnrat (OoM), Grégory Bourdy, Andrew Dodt, Marcus Fraser, Tetsuji Hiratsuka (OoM), Pariya Junhasavasdikul (OoM), Mardan Mamat (OoM), Noh Seung-yul, Thaworn Wiratchant (OoM)

8. Five players - winners of the top rated Japan Golf Tour events, remainder from Order of Merit (21 events met rating)
Hiroyuki Fujita (OoM), Kim Kyung-tae, Shigeki Maruyama, Michio Matsumura (OoM), Katsumasa Miyamoto
Qualified but did not play: Yasuharu Imano

9. Five players - winners of the top rated Sunshine Tour events, remainder from Order of Merit (4 events met rating)
Darren Fichardt (OoM), Anders Hansen (OoM), Pablo Martín, Richie Ramsay, Jaco van Zyl (OoM)

10. Five players - winners of the top rated PGA Tour of Australasia events, remainder from Order of Merit (3 events met rating)
Robert Allenby (12), Alistair Presnell (OoM), Adam Scott, Michael Sim (OoM), Tiger Woods (12)

11. Four players from China
Li Chao, Liang Wenchong, Wu Kangchun, Yuan Hao

12. Any players, not included in above categories, in the top 25 of the OWGR on September 27, 2010
Qualified but did not play: Sean O'Hair

13. If needed to fill the field of 78 players, winners of additional tournaments, ordered by field strength (14 from PGA Tour, 4 from European Tour, 16 from Japan Golf Tour), alternating with those players ranked after the top 25 in OWGR on September 27, 2010
Players in bold were added to the field through this category. Players listed in "()" already qualified in a previous category. Players listed with their name stricken did not play.

Round summaries

First round

Second round

Third round

Final round

Scorecard

Cumulative tournament scores, relative to par

Source:

References

External links
Coverage on European Tour's official site
Coverage on PGA Tour's official site

WGC-HSBC Champions
WGC-HSBC Champions
WGC-HSBC Champions
WGC-HSBC Champions